ZF Friedrichshafen AG, also known as ZF Group, originally Zahnradfabrik Friedrichshafen, and commonly abbreviated to ZF (ZF = "Zahnradfabrik" = "Cogwheel Factory"), is a German car parts maker headquartered in Friedrichshafen, in the south-west German state of Baden-Württemberg. Specialising in engineering, it is primarily known for its design, research and development, and manufacturing activities in the automotive industry. It is a worldwide supplier of driveline and chassis technology for cars and commercial vehicles, along with specialist plant equipment such as construction equipment. It is also involved in rail, marine, defense and aviation industries, as well as general industrial applications. ZF has 188 production locations in 31 countries with approximately 158,000 (2021) employees.

ZF Friedrichshafen is more than 90% owned by the Zeppelin Foundation, which is largely controlled by the town of Friedrichshafen.

History

The company was founded in 1915 in Friedrichshafen, Germany by Luftschiffbau Zeppelin GmbH, to produce gears for Zeppelins and other airships. Zeppelin was unable to otherwise obtain gears for his airships. The German Zahnradfabrik (ZF) translates to 'gear factory' in English.

By 1919, ZF had moved into the automobile market, a move consolidated by the terms of the Treaty of Versailles. Some of the most important milestones that followed:

1920: Patent application submitted for the Soden six speed transmission.
1921: Under a rampant inflation and investor fears, the company went public as the Zepernicker Zahnradfabrik, with the Zeppelin Luftschiffbau GmbH holding 80% of the stock options, valued at 4 million Marks.
1927: Moved to Friedrichshafen and changed the name to ZF Friedrichshafen
1929: A thriving auto industry warrants the series production of the innovative helical ZF Aphon transmission for cars and commercial vehicles.
1932: Launch of steering systems production under license. Today: ZF Lenksysteme GmbH.
1944: On 3 August, the Zahnradfabrik was bombed by the 304th BW / Fifteenth Air Force. As early as 20 September 1942, Albert Speer had warned Hitler of how important the Friedrichshafen tank engine production and the Schweinfurt ball-bearing facilities were. After the bombing, the company was relocated to former location, Zepernick until the 1970s.
1944: Zahnradfabrik Friedrichshafen created the Panzer IV hydrostatischer, the only tank that they modified with their hydraulic drive.
1953: Market launch of the first fully synchronised transmission for commercial vehicles worldwide.
1961: Development of a fully automatic transmission for passenger cars. With series production beginning in 1969, and later proving highly popular, the 3HP20 is built to be swappable with the company's manual transmissions. The 1960s sees ZF supplying transmissions to major German automakers (including DKW, Mercedes-Benz, Porsche and BMW) as well as Peugeot and Alfa Romeo.
1977: Start of volume production for automatic transmissions for commercial vehicles.  Worldwide subsidiaries and factories were opened in the 1970s, and the company moved into India and South Korea.
1980s: ZF started operating in Asia in the mid 80s
1984: Majority shareholding gained in Lemförder Metallwaren AG, today ZF Lemförder GmbH.
1986: Start of USA transmission production in Gainesville, Georgia, for pickup trucks. ZF became a major supplier to Ford in the 1980s.
1991: The 5HP18 was the first 5-speed automatic transmission for passenger cars. Introduced in 1991 on the BMW E36 320i/325i and E34 5 Series
1994: Development of an automatic transmission system for heavy commercial vehicles. The company expanded into China in the 1990s.
1999: World premiere for the first automatic 6-speed transmission. Series production begins in 2001, with the BMW 7 Series as the first client. Today, ZF produces around one million six-speed automatic transmissions annually.
2001: Acquisition of Mannesmann Sachs AG. Today: ZF Sachs AG.
2001: Active Roll Stabilization(ARS) premiere on BMW 7 Series (E65)
2002: Presentation of the world's first 4-point link – a newly developed chassis module for trucks and buses.
2003: First deliveries of the Active Steering systems for passenger cars.
2004: Ford starts volume production of the continuously variable transmissions (CVT) for passenger cars developed by ZF.
2005: The 10-millionth airbag casing, the 5-millionth passenger car axle system and the 2-millionth 'Servolectric' electric power steering system are delivered.
2006: ZF produces the 10-millionth passenger car automatic transmission.
2007: One of the world's first 8-speed automatic transmissions, the 8HP boasted to achieve an 11% improvement in fuel economy in comparison with standard 6-speed automatic transmissions. Production began in 2009.
2008: Acquisition of keyboard manufacturers Cherry Corporation. Incorporated into the ZF Electronics GmbH Corporate Division.
2011: World premiere for the first automatic 9-speed transmission.
Land Rover demonstrated the world's first nine-speed automatic transmission for a passenger car at the 2013 Geneva Motor Show. The ZF 9HP transmission is designed for transverse applications, and is one of the most efficient and technically advanced transmissions ever used in a production vehicle. Land Rover is the lead partner with ZF on this project.
2013: Jeep announces that ZF has developed a nine-speed automatic transmission for use in its all-new 2014 Jeep Cherokee (KL) midsized crossover utility vehicle. 
2013: ZF Opens Passenger Car Transmission Plant in the U.S.
2014: Acquires American auto parts manufacturer TRW Automotive for  $13.5 billion.
2015: Acquires industrial gears and wind turbine gearbox segment from Bosch Rexroth (previously Lohmann & Stolterfoht).
2019: ZF to acquire software specialist for occupant recognition.
2019: ZF to acquire global auto part manufacturer WABCO.
2019: ZF to provide the entire electric powertrain of Mercedes EQC.
2020: ZF completes acquisition of WABCO, which will be integrated into ZF as its Commercial Vehicle Control Systems Division.

Products

ZF Friedrichshafen products include automatic and manual transmissions for cars, trucks, buses and construction equipment; chassis components (ball joints, tie rods, cross-axis joints, stabiliser bars, control arms); shock absorbers and suspension struts; electronic damping systems including Continuous Damping Control (CDC), Active Roll Stabilization (ARS); clutches; torque converters; differentials; axle drives; and industrial drives.

ZF products include
 driveline technology (automatic, manual, servo, automated manual, special transmission, driveline components, rubber-metal technology, transfer case, hybrid system)
 chassis technology (chassis components and modules, steering technology, suspension systems)
 additional technologies (electronic/software, diagnostic systems, precision plastic technology, lubricants)
 Axle systems and drops

Applications
Cars, trucks, buses & coaches, light commercial vehicles, off-road equipment, rail vehicles, helicopters, motorcycles, lift trucks, machine and system construction, test systems, civil mobile, cranes, and special marine, military and agricultural vehicles and machines.

In the ZF Lenksysteme division (a 50:50 joint venture between ZF and Bosch), steering systems and components are produced, including steering columns, gears and pumps; Electric Power Steering (EPS); and Active Steering.

With the rise in popularity of the automatic transmission in buses, ZF introduced the ZF AS Tronic. The company also manufactures manual and automatic truck and bus transmissions.  ZF transmissions are the ones used most commonly in buses. The Ecomat automatic transmission range which was introduced in 1980, is frequently used in buses.

ZF Lemförder and ZF Sachs AG are all divisions/business units of ZF, specialising in original equipment and aftermarket solutions for the automotive industry.

ZF-TRW

ZF-TRW Automotive, headquartered in Livonia, Michigan USA operations primarily surrounding the design, manufacture and sale of safety systems. It operated approximately 200 facilities with 66,100 employees in 26 vehicle-producing countries.

ZF-TRW was acquired in 2015 and now is the 'Active & Passive Safety Technology' division.

Business development

In 1999, the steering systems division was made separate and became the new ZF Lenksysteme GmbH, an independent, 50:50 joint venture between ZF Friedrichshafen and Robert Bosch GmbH.

In 2007 ZF Friedrichshafen managed to increase its business volume about 8% to billion. The operating profit was about million. In 2008 ZF had a profit of million from a total business volume of billion. During the financial crisis ZF was one of the companies hit most. Its business volume decreased in turnover to billion. Total loss was about million. According to the current development ZF is forecasting sales growth of about 10%, which would be above the industry average.

Due to the financial crisis ZF received a credit of about million by KfW. At the end of the term, it has to be paid back with interest. Being a state bank, the KfW aid is not considered governmental support. ZF is about to save million without reducing its permanent staff. Contracts of short-term employees were not extended. Total number of employees was reduced from 63,000 to 59,000 worldwide. According to CEO Härter, there is no need for further employee reduction.

On 16 September 2014, the Wall Street Journal reported that ZF agreed to acquire TRW Automotive Holdings for $13.5 billion. The acquisition would create the world's second largest automotive parts concern, ranked just behind Robert Bosch GmbH.
For clearing way to acquire TRW Automotive Holdings, ZF Friedrichshafen AG sold its stake in ZF Lenksysteme GmbH to Robert Bosch GmbH. ZF Lenksysteme GmbH has now been renamed as Robert Bosch Automotive Steering GmbH.

In September 2020, ZF Friedrichshafen AG entered a partnership with Aeva Inc to put Lidar sensors, a sensor for self-driving vehicles, into production.

Business organisations
The business units are assigned to the nine divisions:
 Active Safety Systems - Sales (2020) €4,987 million: Electronic Stability Control, Integrated Brake Control, Electric Park Brakes, Electrically Powered Steering Systems and Electrically Powered Hydraulic Steering Systems
 Car Chassis Technology - Sales (2020) €6,680 million: chassis components for wheel guidance to complete front and rear axles, including passive and semi-active dampers, as well as electromechanical active chassis systems
 Electrified Powertrain Technology - Sales (2020) 8,459 million: Automatic Transmissions, Automated Manual Transmissions, Manual Transmissions, and Dual-Clutch Automatic Transmissions, Powertrain Modules, Electronic Systems, Electric Motors, Electric Vehicle Drives, Electronic Interfaces
 Electronics & ADAS - Sales (2020) €1,561 million: advanced driver assist systems, sensor technologies, integrated electronics including advanced safety domain control units and safety electronics such as airbag electronic control units and crash sensors for the automotive industry
 Passive Safety Systems - Sales (2020) €3,503 million: airbags, airbag inflators, seat belt systems and steering wheels
 Commercial Vehicle Control Systems - Sales (2020) €1,539 million: braking control systems and other advanced technologies that improve the safety, efficiency and connectivity of commercial vehicles
 Commercial Vehicle Technology - Sales (2020) €3,307 million: automated, manual and powershift transmissions as well as drive components such as clutches and electric drives, and ADAS technology such as automated, camera and radar-based comfort and safety functions for trucks and buses, chassis systems, chassis components and steering systems for vehicles
 Industrial Technology - Sales (2020) €2,687 million: transmissions and axles for agricultural and construction machinery as well as driveline technology for material handling systems, rail and special vehicles, marine propulsion systems, aviation technology as well as the development and production of gearboxes for wind turbines and industrial applications, Test systems for all kinds of applications in driveline and chassis technology
 Aftermarket - Sales (2020) €2,522 million: product brands ZF, LEMFÖRDER, SACHS, TRW and BOGE

Overseas facilities
The ZF Group is represented across the world. The primary market is Europe, followed by the Asia-Pacific region, including Australia, North and South America and Middle East & Africa.

The company has six worldwide research and development (R&D) sites to provide product development related to the local markets. ZF invests approximately 5 percent of its sales revenue on R&D annually.

Since 1973 ZF has played an active role in Great Britain. The manufacturing base in Darlaston provides Britain's automotive industry with chassis components, including Jaguar, BMW and Land Rover. ZF Great Britain Ltd. based in Nottingham has a remanufacturing facility and customer support operation.
ZF participates in the NAFTA Region. With 16 locations, one R & D center near Detroit and about 4,700 employees, North America is an important market base. A manufacturing plant is currently being built in Laurens County, South Carolina. Groundbreaking took place in January 2011, and the facility was completed in April 2012, with production slated to begin in 2013.
Due to the expansion of Asian vehicle manufacturers, ZF has focused strongly on China, Korea and Japan, but also Australia, included in the Asia-Pacific region.
Liuzhou ZF Machinery Co., Ltd. Liuzhou, Guangxi, China is a joint venture company between Guangxi LiuGong Machinery Co., Ltd. of China and ZF Friedrichshafen AG of Germany to manufacture driveline and parts of driveline for construction machinery. Ratified by the People's Government of Guangxi, both shareholders signed the JV Contract in the Great Hall of the People, Beijing, on Dec.12, 1995, and the business license was approved in the same year. Contribution Ratio: Guangxi LiuGong Machinery Co., Ltd.-49% ZF Friedrichshafen AG-51%
ZF has been represented in India with joint ventures and license partnerships for over three decades. In 2007, ZF India Private Ltd. commenced operations in Pune. The focus of production is on axles and off-road driveline technology and commercial vehicle technology. Together with the Head of ZF India, Piyush Munot, Strebl is in charge of setting up new production lines for the off-road axles and transmission systems. The upswing in the construction machinery sector is also apparent in ZF's performance on site: the assembly plant consists of factory buildings with a surface area of 2,500 sq m (approx. 27,000 sq ft) plus a 1,500-sq-m (approx. 16,000 sq ft) warehouse and an integrated aftermarket service facility.

See also
List of ZF transmissions

References

External links

ZF.com official website
 

 
Defence companies of Germany
Auto parts suppliers of Germany
Automotive transmission makers
German brands
Companies based in Friedrichshafen
Manufacturing companies established in 1915
Automotive motorsports and performance companies